Cannaphila insularis, the gray-waisted skimmer, is a species of skimmer in the family Libellulidae. It is found in the Caribbean, Central America, and North America.

The IUCN conservation status of Cannaphila insularis is "LC", least concern, with no immediate threat to the species' survival. The population is stable.

Subspecies
These two subspecies belong to the species Cannaphila insularis.
 Cannaphila insularis funerea (Carpenter, 1897)
 Cannaphila insularis insularis Kirby, 1889

References

Further reading

 
 
 
 
 
 
 
 

Libellulidae
Insects described in 1889